Dumas is a city in Desha County, Arkansas, United States. The population was 4,706 at the 2010 census.

History
In 1870, a planter, merchant and surveyor of French descent, William B. Dumas, bought acres of farmland from the Abercrombie Holmes family. The area was named Watson District and the town continued to develop. Then, the District was renamed Dumas and was incorporated in 1904.

Dumas proudly proclaims itself as "Home of the Ding Dong Daddy", a reference to the vaudeville song "I'm a Ding Dong Daddy from Dumas" by Phil Baxter. However, this is up for debate, as the city of Dumas, Texas, also lays claim, with some documentation, to the song being about them.

On February 24, 2007, Dumas was struck by a long-tracked F3 tornado. Twenty-eight people were injured, and many homes and business were damaged or destroyed. Police said on CNN that "the feed mill was the local employer and now it is gone". Following the storm, U.S. Senator Mark Pryor criticized the Federal Emergency Management Agency's response to the recovery and cleanup efforts.

On March 19, 2022, two gunmen killed one person and injured at least 26 others, including six children, at the Hood-Nic Festival, an annual car show held in the city. One suspect was later arrested and admitted to firing a gun at another man present at the festival.

Geography
Dumas is located in northwestern Desha County at  (33.886626, -91.488544). The city is located in the Delta Lowlands sub-region of the Arkansas Delta, producing a topography which is largely flat.

Climate
The climate in the area is characterized by hot, humid summers and generally mild to cool winters. According to the Köppen Climate Classification system, Dumas has a humid subtropical climate, abbreviated "Cfa" on climate maps.

Demographics

2020 census

As of the 2020 United States Census, there were 4,001 people, 1,739 households, and 1,207 families residing in the city.

2000 census
As of the census of 2000, there were 5,238 people, 1,977 households, and 1,399 families residing in the city. The racial makeup of the city was 26.62% White, 70.02% Black or African American, 0.08% Native American, 0.50% Asian, 2.00% from other races, and 0.78% from two or more races.  3.19% of the population were Hispanic or Latino of any race.

There were 1,977 households, out of which 36.4% had children under the age of 18 living with them, 43.9% were married couples living together, 23.4% had a female householder with no husband present, and 29.2% were non-families. 27.4% of all households were made up of individuals, and 12.9% had someone living alone who was 65 years of age or older.  The average household size was 2.63 and the average family size was 3.19.

In the city, the population was spread out, with 30.1% under the age of 18, 10.7% from 18 to 24, 24.9% from 25 to 44, 21.2% from 45 to 64, and 13.1% who were 65 years of age or older.  The median age was 33 years. For every 100 females, there were 83.9 males.  For every 100 females age 18 and over, there were 78.3 males.

The median income for a household in the city was $25,754, and the median income for a family was $32,255. Males had a median income of $28,396 versus $19,363 for females. The per capita income for the city was $12,727.  About 22.6% of families and 28.8% of the population were below the poverty line, including 39.9% of those under age 18 and 23.4% of those age 65 or over.

Education
Dumas is served by the Dumas School District.

Highways
U.S. Route 65 passes through the city, leading northwest  to Pine Bluff and south (with U.S. Route 165)  to McGehee. US 165 leads northeast from Dumas  to DeWitt.

Notable people
Jim Hines (born September 10, 1946), Olympic gold medalist
Slink Johnson Actor, producer, comedian
Charlotte Tillar Schexnayder (December 25, 1923 - December 11, 2020), Newspaper editor and publisher, state legislator

In popular culture
In September 2011 the feature film Mud, written and directed by Jeff Nichols and starring Reese Witherspoon and Matthew McConaughey, was filmed in and around Dumas. Several townspeople served as extras in the film, with a few having acquired small speaking roles.

The Comedy Central docu-reality series Nathan For You filmed portions of its Season 4 finale, "Finding Frances," in Dumas.

See also

Arkansas Post National Memorial
List of cities and towns in Arkansas
National Register of Historic Places listings in Desha County, Arkansas

References

External links

Dumas Public Schools
History of Dumas' Jewish community (from the Institute of Southern Jewish Life)
Encyclopedia of Arkansas History & Culture entry: Dumas (Desha County)

Cities in Desha County, Arkansas
Cities in Arkansas
1904 establishments in Arkansas